Aula Magna (Latin, 'great hall') may refer to:
 Aula Magna (Central University of Venezuela)
 Aula Magna (Stockholm University), Sweden
 Aula Magna (UCLouvain), Belgium